El Nido may refer to:

Places
El Nido, Merced County, California
El Nido, Los Angeles County, California, community in Los Angeles County near Malibu
El Nido, Torrance, California, neighborhood in Torrance, California
El Nido, Palawan, Philippines

Others
El Nido (film), a 1979 Spanish film
El Nido, Hamilton, a heritage-listed house in Brisbane, Queensland, Australia
The fictional island archipelago from Chrono Cross
The Nest (aviary), El Nido in Spanish, an aviary in Ixtapaluca, Mexico